The 2015 Lagos State House of Assembly election was held on 11 April 2015, to elect members of the Lagos State House of Assembly in Nigeria. All the 40 seats were up for election in the Lagos State House of Assembly. APC won 32 seats, while PDP won 8 seats. 

Upon the opening of the 8th State House of Assembly, Mudashiru Obasa (APC-Agege I) was elected as Speaker of the House while Wasiu Sanni (APC-Lagos Island I) and Agunbiade Sanai (APC-Ikorodu I) became Deputy Speaker and House Leader, respectively.

Results

Badagry I 
APC candidate Layode Olanrewaju won the election.

Apapa II 
APC candidate Jimoh Olumuyiwa won the election.

Apapa I 
APC candidate Lawal Mojisola Lasbat won the election.

Alimosho I 
APC candidate Adebisi Yusuff won the election.

Alimosho II 
APC candidate Oduntan Omotayo won the election.

Agege II 
APC candidate Oluyinka Ogundimu won the election.

Agege I 
APC candidate Mudashiru Obasa won the election.

Ikeja I 
APC candidate Folajimi Mohammed won the election.

Kosofe II 
APC candidate Tunde Braimoh won the election.

Ikeja II 
APC candidate Adedamola Kasumu won the election.

Somolu II 
APC candidate Abiru Rotimi Lateef won the election.

Badagry II 
APC candidate Setonji David won the election.

Lagos Island II 
APC candidate Giwa Sakirudeen won the election.

Epe I 
APC candidate Tobun Abiodun won the election.

Epe II 
APC candidate Segun Olulade won the election.

Eti-Osa I 
APC candidate Alimi Kazeem Ademola won the election.

Eti-Osa II 
APC candidate Yisawu Olusegun Gbolahan won the election.

Ibeju/Lekki I 
APC candidate Mojeed Fatai won the election.

Ibeju/Lekki II 
APC candidate Kazeem Raheem Adewale won the election.

Ifako/Ijaye I 
APC candidate Dayo Fafunmi won the election.

Ifako/Ijaye II 
APC candidate Makinde Rasheed Lanre won the election.

Ikorodu I 
APC candidate Agunbiade Sanai won the election.

Ikorodu II 
APC candidate Solaja-Saka Nurudeen won the election.

Kosofe I 
APC candidate Osinowo Sikiru won the election.

Lagos Island I 
APC candidate Wasiu Sanni won the election.

Lagos Mainland I 
APC candidate Adekanye Oladele won the election.

Lagos Mainland II 
APC candidate Oshun Moshood won the election.

Mushin I 
APC candidate Tejuoso Funmilayo won the election.

Mushin II 
APC candidate Olayiwola Olawale won the election.

Ojo II 
APC candidate Lanre Ogunyemi won the election.

Somolu I 
APC candidate Rotimi Olowo won the election.

Surulere I 
APC candidate Desmond Elliot won the election.

Surulere II 
PDP candidate Mosunmola Sangodara-Rotimi won the election.

Ajeromi/Ifelodun II 
PDP candidate Oluwa Olatunji Fatai won the election.

Ojo I 
PDP candidate Olusegun Victor Akande won the election.

Oshodi/Isolo II 
PDP candidate Emeka Odimogu won the election.

Oshodi/Isolo II 
PDP candidate Shokunle Hakeem won the election.

Amuwo/Odofin II 
PDP candidate Hakeem Bello won the election.

Amuwo/Odofin I 
PDP candidate Dipo Olorunrinu won the election.

Ajeromi/Ifelodun I 
PDP candidate Famakinwa Adedayo Olufemi won the election.

References 

Lagos State House of Assembly elections
House of Assembly
Lagos